Golo Brdo is a small village in the Municipality of Brda in the Littoral region of Slovenia, right on the border with Italy.

The local church, built on a small hill outside the village, is dedicated to the Virgin Mary and belongs to the Parish of Kožbana.

References

External links
Golo Brdo on Geopedia

Populated places in the Municipality of Brda